Francis Elliott Young (28 September 1876 - 1958) was a civil rights leader and union organizer from Cleveland, Ohio.

Biography
He was born on 28 September 1876 in Cleveland, Ohio.

Young helped organize the Cleveland branch of the NAACP and the AFL postal union. He entered politics after retiring as a postal supervisor.

In 1954, he ran for Ohio's 21st congressional district. The district was evenly divided between African Americans, who were solidly Republican, and whites, who were mostly Democrats. After winning a hard-fought Republican primary, the 78-year-old Young lost to Charles Vanik, a judge.

He died in 1958.

References 

1876 births
1958 deaths
Politicians from Cleveland
Ohio Republicans
Brown University alumni